Mathur is a village in the Thanjavur taluk of Thanjavur district, Tamil Nadu, India.

Demographics 

As per the 2001 census, Mathur had a total population of 5182 with 2639 males and 2543 females. The sex ratio was 964. The literacy rate was 71.28.

References 

 

Villages in Thanjavur district